Carlo Castellaneta (8 February 1930 - 28 September 2013) was an Italian author and journalist.

Born in Milan, Castellaneta began to work at young age, first in an art gallery and then in the publishing house Arnoldo Mondadori Editore as a proofreader.  In 1958 Elio Vittorini, consultant of the publishing house, read the manuscript of Castellaneta's novel Viaggio col padre, and approved the publication; then Castellaneta began a long and prolific career as a novelist, with novels translated into English, French, Spanish and German, but also as a journalist for Il Corriere della Sera and Storia Illustrata of which he was also director.  Castellaneta was also chairman of the La Scala Theatre Museum.

His novel Notti e nebbie (Nights and mists, 1975) was adapted into an eponymous 1984 television miniseries directed by Marco Tullio Giordana.

Castellaneta died on 28 September 2013 in a hospital in Palmanova as a result of complications of pneumonia.

References 

1930 births
2013 deaths
Journalists from Milan
Italian male journalists
20th-century Italian novelists
20th-century Italian male writers